Poul Erik Bæk (born 11 August 1940) is a Danish equestrian. He competed in two events at the 1960 Summer Olympics.

References

External links
 

1940 births
Living people
Danish male equestrians
Olympic equestrians of Denmark
Equestrians at the 1960 Summer Olympics